Sergei Rublevsky (born 15 October 1974) is a Russian chess grandmaster (1994). He has won four team gold medals and one individual bronze medal at Chess Olympiads. He won the prestigious Aeroflot Open in 2004, and became the 58th Russian chess champion after winning the Russian Superfinal in Moscow (18–30 December 2005), one point clear from Dmitry Jakovenko and Alexander Morozevich.

He finished in the top 10 in the 2005 FIDE World Cup, which qualified him for the Candidates Tournament for the FIDE World Chess Championship 2007, played in May–June 2007. He defeated Ruslan Ponomariov 3½-2½ in the first round. In the second round he played Alexander Grischuk. The match was tied 3-3, but Grischuk won the rapid playoff 2½-½, eliminating Rublevsky from the championship.

Style

GM Nigel Short said of Rublevsky, "Rublevsky is not a sexy player. There are younger and more gifted individuals around and he knows it. Yet he has canniness, which the greenhorns don't. He does not engage the teenagers on the sharp end of opening theory, testing his ailing memory against the freshness of their computer-assisted analysis. Instead he heads a little off the beaten track - not exactly to the jungle, but to lesser-travelled byways where his experience counts."

GM Alexander Morozevich has said, "... my opening repertoire is not any ‘weirder’ than, say, that of Rublevsky."

With White, Rublevsky plays 1.e4 the overwhelming percentage of the time.

Against 1...e5, Rublevsky plays the Scotch. Against 1...c5, Rublevsky sometimes goes for Open Sicilians, but he has a couple of non-Open pet lines: 1.e4 c5 2.Nf3 d6 3.Bb5+ and 1.e4 c5 2.Nf3 e6 3.c4. Against the French and Caro-Kann, he plays 2.d4 followed by 3.Nd2.

With Black, he meets 1.e4 with Kan/Paulsen/Taimanov Sicilians; against 1.d4 he generally plays the Queen's Gambit Accepted and the occasional Slav.

Notable games
Sergei Rublevsky vs Garry Kasparov, 20th European Club Cup 2004,  Sicilian Defense: Nyezhmetdinov-Rossolimo Attack (B30), 1-0
Sergei Rublevsky vs Alexey Dreev, Russian Championship Superfinal 2005, Sicilian Defense: Nyezhmetdinov-Rossolimo Attack (B30), 1-0
Sergei Rublevsky vs Pentala Harikrishna, Aerosvit GM Tournament 2006, Sicilian Defense: Canal Attack (B51), 1-0
Sergei Rublevsky vs Ruslan Ponomariov, Candidates Match: Ponomariov-Rublevsky 2007, Caro-Kann Defense: Bronstein-Larsen Variation (B16), 1/2-1/2

References

External links
 
 
 
 Chessbase article on Russian Championship

1974 births
Living people
Russian chess players
Chess grandmasters
Chess Olympiad competitors
People from Kurgan, Kurgan Oblast